The Arizona Board of Regents (ABOR) is the governing body of Arizona's public university system. It provides policy guidance to Arizona State University, Northern Arizona University, the University of Arizona, and their branch campuses.

History
In 1885, the territorial legislature authorized the establishment of the University of Arizona and provided for the management, direction, governance, and control by a board of regents. The state colleges, one in Tempe and one in Flagstaff, were governed by a three-member state board of education that included the Superintendent of Public Instruction and two members appointed by the Governor of Arizona.

In March 1945, the governor signed a law uniting the governing boards of the university and state colleges of Arizona. The authority of the board of regents expanded to include the Arizona State Teachers College at Tempe (now Arizona State University), and Arizona State Teachers College at Flagstaff (now Northern Arizona University).

Organization
The governor appoints eight volunteer members for staggered eight-year terms; two students serve on the Board for two-year appointments, with the first year being a non-voting apprentice year. The governor and the Superintendent of Public Instruction serve as voting ex officio members. The ABOR provides policy guidance and oversight to the three major degree-granting universities as provided for by Title 15 of the Arizona Revised Statutes.

The board of regents is a constitutionally created body corporate. It exists on a plane equivalent to that of the legislature. Arizona universities have no independent legal existence but are extensions of the board.

References

External links
 Official site

Public education in Arizona
Organizations established in 1945
1945 establishments in Arizona
Governing bodies of universities and colleges in the United States
Public university systems in the United States